The Satanic Rites of Dracula is a 1973 British horror film directed by Alan Gibson and produced by Hammer Film Productions. It is the eighth film in Hammer's Dracula series, and the seventh and final one to feature Christopher Lee as Dracula. The film was also the third to unite Peter Cushing as Van Helsing with Lee, following Dracula (1958) and Dracula A.D. 1972 (1972).

Plot 
In 1974, a Secret Service agent barely escapes from an English country house, in which satanic rituals are being celebrated. Before he dies of his wounds, he reveals to his superiors that four prominent members of society – a government minister, a peer, a general and a famous scientist – are involved in a cult led by Chin Yang. Photos of the four dignitaries taken by the agent are developed, and a fifth photo, apparently showing an empty doorway, is assumed to be a mistake. In order to avoid any reprisals by the minister, Secret Service official Colonel Mathews calls in Scotland Yard's Inspector Murray to work on the case independently. Murray suggests consulting a noted occult expert, Professor Lorrimer Van Helsing.

The cult kidnaps the Secret Service secretary Jane, who is later bitten by Count Dracula. Murray, Secret Service agent Torrence and Van Helsing's granddaughter Jessica arrive at the country house. They separate; Murray and Torrence investigate inside the house, where they meet Chin Yang. Jessica enters the house through the cellar, where she finds Jane chained to a wall; she is revealed to be a vampire. The ensuing commotion awakens other female vampires who are likewise imprisoned, but they attempt to feed on Jessica. The agents hear Jessica's screams and come to her rescue. Murray kills Jane with a stake, and he escapes the grounds with Jessica and Torrence. Meanwhile, Van Helsing visits his scientist friend, Julian Keeley, whom he recognized among the four conspirators. The mentally unstable Keeley is involved in bacteriological research designed to create a virulent strain of the bubonic plague. Van Helsing is shot by a guard and passes out. When he revives, Keeley's dead body hangs from the ceiling, and the plague bacillus is gone.

Keeley referred to the 23rd of the month, which Van Helsing discovers is the "Sabbath of the Undead". Keeley's research notes lead Van Helsing to the reclusive property developer D. D. Denham, who funded Keeley's research. Van Helsing speculates that the fifth photo of an empty doorway may actually have been of Dracula, whose image cannot be captured; he theorizes that Dracula wants to finally die, but in his evil, will want to destroy all of humanity with him. Van Helsing visits Denham in his headquarters (built on the church yard where Dracula died in the previous film) and discovers that he is actually Dracula. He tries to shoot Dracula with a silver bullet, but is beaten by the Count's conspirators. Dracula decides that killing Van Helsing would be too simple and has him moved to the country house. Jessica, Murray, Mathews and Torrence, while observing the country house, are attacked by snipers. Torrence and Mathews are killed, and Murray and Jessica are captured. Murray awakes in the cellar and escapes the clutches of Chin Yang, revealed to be a vampire herself. After staking her through the heart with a mallet, he destroys the other female vampires with clear running water from the fire sprinkler system.

Dracula arrives at the house with Van Helsing. He announces to his henchmen that Jessica will be his consort, uncorrupted by the plague that his "four horsemen" – including Van Helsing – will carry out into the world. The conspirators, who had considered the plague a threat not to be used, begin to question their master. Dracula's hypnotic command brings them back under his control. He commands John Porter to break the vial, releasing the bacteria and immediately infecting the minister. Murray overpowers a guard in the computer room. The guard's metal baton smashes a computer panel, causing an explosion that starts a fire and unlocks the ritual room. Two uninfected conspirators escape, Murray rescues Jessica, and the infected minister and the plague bacteria burn in the fire. Dracula attacks Van Helsing, but his prey escapes through a window into the woods. Van Helsing lures Dracula into a hawthorn bush where he is entangled. Van Helsing grabs a fence post and drives it through his heart. Dracula disintegrates into ashes, and Van Helsing retrieves the Count's ring.

Cast 
 Christopher Lee as Count Dracula / D.D. Denham
 Peter Cushing as Lorrimer Van Helsing
 Michael Coles as Inspector Murray
 William Franklyn as Peter Torrence
 Richard Vernon as Colonel Mathews 
 Joanna Lumley as Jessica Van Helsing
 Valerie Van Ost as Jane
 Barbara Yu Ling as Chin Yang
 Freddie Jones as Dr. Julian Keeley
 Maurice O'Connell as Agent Hanson
 Richard Mathews as John Porter, MP
 Patrick Barr as Lord Carradine
 Lockwood West as General Sir Arthur Freeborne
 Peter Adair as doctor
 John Harvey as the Commissionaire
 Maggie Fitzgerald, Pauline Peart, Finnuala O'Shannon as vampire girls
 Mia Martin as girl on altar 
 Marc Zuber, Paul Weston, Ian Dewar, Graham Rees as guards

Production 

In addition to Lee and Cushing returning from Dracula A.D. 1972, Coles also reprised his role (Inspector Murray). The part of Van Helsing's granddaughter, Jessica, was recast with Lumley, as a more mature character than that portrayed by Stephanie Beacham in the previous film. The screenplay, a mixture of horror, science fiction and a spy thriller, was written by Don Houghton, who had worked on Doctor Who. Television veteran John Cacavas composed the original score.

Production began in November 1972. The working title of the movie was Dracula is Dead ... and Well and Living in London, a reference to the stage and film musical revue Jacques Brel is Alive and Well and Living in Paris. Lee was not amused. Speaking at a 1973 press conference announcing the feature, he said:

I'm doing it under protest ... I think it is fatuous. I can think of twenty adjectives – fatuous, pointless, absurd. It's not a comedy, but it's got a comic title. I don't see the point.

The film was eventually retitled, but was still marketed in French as Dracula vit toujours à Londres ('Dracula Is Still Living in London').

As movie historian Jonathan Rigby has observed, the feature "wrapped on 3 January 1973, 15 years to the day" after Dracula, the first film in the Hammer series, finished shooting.

This was the last Hammer movie that Lee and Cushing would make together, although they would reunite one final time ten years later, for House of the Long Shadows.

The feature was not released in the United States until 1979, when Dynamite Entertainment distributed a heavily edited version under the title Count Dracula and His Vampire Bride.

Critical reception 
AllMovie called it the "least interesting" film in the Hammer Dracula series. Time Out wrote, "a lot of weak action scenes and weaker lines, but still a vast improvement on Dracula A.D. 1972."

See also 
 Vampire film

References

External links 

 
 
 

1970s English-language films
1973 horror films
1973 films
British science fiction horror films
Hammer Film Productions horror films
Columbia Pictures films
Dracula films
Films directed by Alan Gibson
Films set in 1974
Films about Satanism
British supernatural thriller films
Gothic horror films
Films shot at EMI-Elstree Studios
Films shot in Hertfordshire
Films shot in London
Dracula (Hammer film series)
Warner Bros. films
1970s British films